The Grazer Gruppe is an Austrian writers group centred on Graz, with notable writers among its ranks such as Peter Handke and Elfriede Jelinek and Barbara Frischmuth.

References
 :de:Grazer Gruppe

Writing circles
Austrian literature
Cultural organisations based in Austria